Kelly Oliver (born 1973) is a male retired boxer who competed for England.

Boxing career
Oliver was four times National Champion in 1992, 1993, 1994 and 1995 after winning the prestigious ABA light-heavyweight title, boxing out of the Bracebridge ABC.

He represented England in the light-heavyweight (-81 kg) division, at the 1994 Commonwealth Games in Victoria, British Columbia, Canada.

He turned professional on 20 January 1996 and fought in 23 fights until 2008.

References

1973 births
English male boxers
Boxers at the 1994 Commonwealth Games
Living people
Light-heavyweight boxers
Commonwealth Games competitors for England